The 2015 Emirates Melbourne Cup was the 155th running of the Melbourne Cup, a prestigious Australian Thoroughbred horse race. The date is a public holiday in the state of Victoria. The final field for the race was declared on 31 October. The total prize money for the race was A$6.2 million, the same as the previous year.

The winner was Prince of Penzance, ridden by Michelle Payne, who became the first female jockey to win the Melbourne Cup. He was trained by Darren Weir, who has since been banned from horseracing & charged with animal cruelty offences.

Max Dynamite ran second and Criterion third.

Background
Prior to the race, racehorse advocacy groups and animal rights activists attempted to highlight the number of racehorse deaths due to injuries sustained during a race. The death of two horses in Melbourne Cup 2014 race has called into question the use of the whip and whether it results in unnecessary harm to the animal. Racing Australia has since amended its rules governing the use of the whip, effective from 1 December 2015.

Race summary

Prince of Penzance, ridden by jockey Michelle Payne, won the race. He was trained by Darren Weir, who has since been banned from horseracing & charged with animal cruelty offences.

Max Dynamite ran second and Criterion third.

Prince of Penzance pulled ahead of the front-runners only around 100m from the finish of the race, surprising many, including Payne. Payne's technique focused on galloping, due to her belief that doing so was key to winning.

Field

† Indicates race favourite

Fatalities

Three-time cup runner-up Red Cadeaux did not finish, suffering a suspected fracture in the left fetlock, a joint above the hoof similar to an ankle in humans. The gelding was taken to a veterinary clinic for surgery. Red Cadeaux's trainer initially announced that the horse would likely recover, but retired from racing. However, on 21 November, Red Cadeaux was euthanised, due to complications from the injury.

See also
 List of Melbourne Cup winners
 List of Melbourne Cup placings

References

2015
Melbourne Cup
Melbourne Cup
2010s in Melbourne
November 2015 sports events in Australia